Dövlətalıbəyli (also, Dövlətəlibəyli, Devlyat-Ali-Beyli, and Dovlyatalybeyli) is a village and municipality in the Jalilabad Rayon of Azerbaijan.  It has a population of 375.

References 

Populated places in Jalilabad District (Azerbaijan)